The Peugeot Onyx is a concept sports car produced by the French car manufacturer Peugeot and presented at the 2012 Paris Motor Show.

Design and Performance

Design 

Designed by the Peugeot design center of chief designer Gilles Vidal, the bodywork (with its onyx mineral appearance) is hand-crafted by a master craftsman, made of carbon fiber and copper foils. The taillights adopt the stylistic three-claw signature of the Peugeot lion, and its taut lines (inspired among others by the Peugeot Proxima, Peugeot Oxia, Peugeot RCZ, Peugeot SR1, and Peugeot HX1) influence the styling of future Peugeot models 2015.

Engine 

Gallery

References 

Onyx
Cars introduced in 2012
Coupés
Hybrid electric cars